Melzo is a comune (municipality) in the Province of Milan in the Italian region Lombardy, located about  east of Milan.

Melzo borders the following municipalities: Gorgonzola, Pozzuolo Martesana, Cassina de' Pecchi, Vignate, Truccazzano, Liscate.

Melzo received the honorary title of city with a presidential decree on March 14, 1952. It is served by Melzo railway station.

Demographic evolution

Twin towns
Melzo is twinned with:

  Vilafranca del Penedès, Spain

References

External links
 www.comune.melzo.mi.it

Cities and towns in Lombardy